Monks is the surname of:

Clifford Monks (1912-1974), English cricketer
Constance Monks (1911-1989), British politician and teacher
George Monks (cricketer) (born 1929), English former cricketer
George Howard Monks (1853-1933), American board game designer and surgeon
Helen Monks, English actress and writer
Jason Monks, American politician, Idaho State Representative since 2012
John Monks (born 1945), British politician
John Monks Jr. (1910-2004), American author, actor, playwright, screenwriter and director
John Austin Sands Monks (1850–1917), American painter
John Clark Monks (1760–1827), English sea captain also known as the Hanging Sailor of Perryman 
Joseph M. Monks (born 1968), American writer and film director
Neale Monks (born 1971), British former palaeontologist
Peter Monks, English footballer
Robert A. G. Monks (born 1933), American shareholder activist and author
Sarah P. Monks (1841–1926), American naturalist and poet
Victoria Monks (1884–1927), British music hall singer

See also
Monk (surname)